Lion-sur-Mer (literally Lion on Sea) is a commune in the Calvados department in the Normandy region in northwestern France.

Geography
Lion-sur-Mer is located on the edge of the English Channel, more precisely on the Côte de Nacre (Mother of Pearl Coast), about  North of Caen.

The beach is made of fine sand and is bordered, to the west, by middle-sized cliffs.

The town is served by 2 bus services : line No. 1 of the Bus Verts du Calvados and line No. 62 of Twisto.
A ferry of Brittany Ferries links Ouistreham (5 km from Lion-sur-Mer) to Portsmouth in England.

History
 6 June 1944 : The D-Day of the Battle of Normandy during World War II. British soldiers landed on the beach of Lion-sur-Mer which was a part of the Sword Beach sector.

Population

Sights
 The beach, its promenade (La digue) and its villas from the beginning of the 20th century

 Saint-Pierre church (Tower from the 1st half of the 12th century)

 Lion-sur-Mer castle (Closed to the public)

 The "le Castel Louis" or "la Villa Louis" house (listed building), ancient casino built in 1866–1868 and then transformed in the art nouveau style.
The town is crossed by the EuroVelo 4 track.

Events
 "Les terrasses de l'été" ("The summer terraces") : about 40 free animations and concerts in July and August.
 Flea markets several times per year.

Sport
 Hermanville sporting club (8 tennis clay courts)
 Municipal sailing school
 Sport complex (Gymnasium, tennis courts and soccer field)

International relations
Lion-sur-Mer is twinned with:
  Kiebingen in Baden-Württemberg, Germany

See also
Communes of the Calvados department

References

Bibliography
  Villas de Lion-sur-Mer et Hermanville-sur-Mer, Coll. Itinéraires du patrimoine, n°125

External links

  Lion sur Mer...Autrefois (Blog featuring old postcards of Lion-sur-Mer)

Communes of Calvados (department)
Populated coastal places in France
Seaside resorts in France
Calvados communes articles needing translation from French Wikipedia